Acetes is a genus of small shrimp that resemble krill, which is native to the western and central Indo-Pacific, the Atlantic coast of the Americas, Pacific coast of South America and inland waters of South America. Although most are from marine or estuarine habitats, the South American A. paraguayensis is a fresh water species. Several of its species are important for the production of shrimp paste in Southeast Asia, including A. japonicus, which is the world's most heavily fished species of wild shrimp or prawn in terms of total tonnage.

In Southeast Asia, Acetes have different local names depending on the country. It is known as rebon in Indonesia, geragau in Malaysia, bubuk in Brunei, alamang in the Philippines, among others.

Description
The genus is characterised by the loss of the fourth and fifth pairs of pereiopods.

Life cycle
The eggs of Acetes are green. As they develop, they swell to twice their original size or more. The eggs hatch early in the year, and the larvae grow, mature and spawn in the same year.

Taxonomy

It includes 14 species, which are listed here with their FAO endorsed common names:
Acetes americanus Ortmann, 1893 – aviu shrimp
Acetes binghami Burkenroad, 1934
Acetes chinensis Hansen, 1919 – northern mauxia shrimp
Acetes erythraeus Nobili, 1905 – tsivakihini paste shrimp
Acetes indicus H. Milne-Edwards, 1830 – Jawala paste shrimp
Acetes intermedius Omori, 1975 – Taiwan mauxia shrimp
Acetes japonicus Kishinouye, 1905 –  paste shrimp
Acetes johni Nataraj, 1947
Acetes marinus Omori, 1975
Acetes natalensis Barnard, 1950
Acetes paraguayensis Hansen, 1919
Acetes serrulatus (Krøyer, 1859) – southern mauxia shrimp
Acetes sibogae Hansen, 1919 – alamang shrimp
Acetes vulgaris Hansen, 1919 – jembret shrimp

Fishery
Many species of Acetes are fished for commercially, and the different species are often not discriminated. Fishers mostly use push nets and bag nets, as well as seines both on boats and from the shore.

Preparation
Only a small proportion of the entire catch is sold fresh, with most of it being dried, salted or fermented. The prawns are then crushed using cleavers and packed into various containers, where the paste remains for around 4 hours. After this, the paste is re-packed, before being left to mature for a month, after which it is mixed and crushed again, and then packed for sale. If a producer cannot sell the paste quickly, it can be kept for up to 6 months, mincing it every month or so. The resulting paste is reported to contain 16.2% protein and 1.3% fat.

See also
 Shrimp fishery
 Shrimp paste

References

Dendrobranchiata
Decapod genera
Commercial crustaceans
Edible crustaceans
Taxa named by Henri Milne-Edwards